Richard Brooks (1912–1992) was an American screenwriter, film director and novelist.

Richard Brooks also may refer to:

Entertainment
Richard E. Brooks (1865–1919), American sculptor
Richard Brooks (singer) (born 1940), American soul singer
Richard Brooks (actor) (born 1962), American actor, singer and director
Dick Brooks (magician), American magician

Sports
Richard Brooks (cricketer) (1863–1927), English cricketer
Rich Brooks (born 1941), American football coach
Dick Brooks (1942–2006), NASCAR driver
Dickie Brooks (born 1943), English cricketer

Other
Richard Brooks (captain) (1765–1833), ship's captain and early Australian settler
Richard Brooks (journalist), English investigative journalist and author

See also

 Ricard Brooks (1894–1954), American muralist and painter
 Richard Brookes, English physician and author
 Richard Brookes (footballer), English footballer
 Rick Brookes (born 1948), British satirical cartoonist
 Richard Brook (disambiguation)
 Richard Brooke (disambiguation)
 Brooks (surname)